Alena Kholod (born 26 November 1995) is a Russian female acrobatic gymnast. With partners Valeriia Belkina and Victoria Ilicheva, Kholod achieved silver in the 2014 Acrobatic Gymnastics World Championships.

References

External links

 

1995 births
Living people
Russian acrobatic gymnasts
Female acrobatic gymnasts
Place of birth missing (living people)
21st-century Russian women